Whitehall District Schools is a school district located in  Muskegon County, Michigan. It serves the city of Whitehall and the townships of Whitehall, Fruitland, Dalton, Blue Lake and the Village of Lakewood Club.

Its mascot is the Viking.

It is a member of the Muskegon Area Intermediate School District.

Schools
Whitehall Shoreline Elementary (grades K-2, opened in 1994)
Helen R. Ealy Elementary (grades 3–5)
Whitehall Middle School (grades 6–8)
Whitehall Senior High School (grades 9–12,opened in 2004)
Whitehall Community Center (was the senior high school from 1960 until 2004)
Viking Athletic Center

Demographics
As of 2020, Whitehall District Schools is 85% White, 10% Black, 2% Hispanic, 2% American Indian, 1% Multi-Racial.

Board of Education 2021-22

Notable alumni
Nate McLouth, professional baseball player for the Washington Nationals and Gold Glove Awards winner.
Stacy Essebaggers-Shepherd, 2001 Miss Michigan, and Top-10 semifinalist at the Miss America pageant.
Ryan Van Bergen, played Defensive End for the University of Michigan, 2008–2011.
Kellin Quinn (Bostwick), lead singer of Sleeping With Sirens, graduated in 2004

See also
List of school districts in Michigan

References

External links

School districts in Michigan
Education in Muskegon County, Michigan